Max Frederick Willis,  (6 December 1935 – 18 August 2021) was an Australian politician and senior Army Reserve officer. He was a Liberal member of the New South Wales Legislative Council from 1970 to 1999. His brother Sir Eric Willis was briefly Premier of New South Wales in 1976.

Born in Murwillumbah, Willis was the son of Archibald Clarence Willis, a butter factory hand, and Vida Buttenshaw. He was educated at Murwillumbah High School and then received a Bachelor of Laws from the University of Sydney in 1957. Following his admission as a solicitor in 1958, Willis became a partner with Serisier, Willis and Bowring in Miranda until 1971. On 8 August 1970 he married Wendy Patricia Booth, with whom he had four children. Willis had joined the Citizen Military Forces in 1953, and was involved in the Army Reserve for thirty years, attaining the rank of brigadier. For his military service, Willis was awarded the Reserve Force Decoration (RFD) and the Efficiency Decoration (ED) by the Australian Government, and the Cross of Solomon Islands (CSI). He was also awarded the Centenary Medal on 1 January 2001, and the National Medal with clasp on 24 October 2001.

In 1970 Willis was appointed to the New South Wales Legislative Council. He was Deputy Leader of the Opposition in the council from 1977 to 1978 and Leader from 1978 to 1981. In 1991 he was elected President of the council, succeeding Johno Johnson who had been president since 1978. Willis was forced to resign as the president and from the house when, under the influence of alcohol, he was unable to control proceedings during voting on a motion to dismiss Supreme Court Justice Vince Bruce. He was replaced by Virginia Chadwick in 1998 and retired from politics in 1999. Willis died in August 2021, aged 85.

References

 

 

1935 births
2021 deaths
Military personnel from New South Wales
Australian brigadiers
Australian military personnel of the Vietnam War
Australian monarchists
Liberal Party of Australia members of the Parliament of New South Wales
Deaths from cancer in New South Wales
Members of the New South Wales Legislative Council
Presidents of the New South Wales Legislative Council
Recipients of the Centenary Medal
Recipients of the Cross of Solomon Islands
University of Sydney alumni